Katzenstein may refer to:

People
 Caroline Katzenstein, suffragist
 Henry Katzenstein, American physicist and entrepreneur
 Jacob Katzenstein, German otorhinolaryngologist
 Julius Katzenstein or Joseph Kastein, German writer
 Leopold Katzenstein, German naval architect and marine engineer
 Peter J. Katzenstein, international relations scholar
 Walther Katzenstein, German rower

Places
Germany
 Katzenstein (Affalter), a mountain in Saxony, Germany
 Katzenstein (Habichtswald), a mountain in Hesse, Germany
 Katzenstein (Pobershau), a mountain in Saxony, Germany
 Katzenstein Castle, a castle in Baden-Württemberg, Germany
Slovenia
 Katzenstein mansion or Kacenštajn Castle

Other uses
 Raab-Katzenstein, German aircraft manufacturer
 Raab-Katzenstein RK-26, German aircraft type
 The Rabbi Martin Katzenstein Award